Charnock is an English locational surname. It originates from two places, Charnock Richard and Heath Charnock, both in Lancashire.

The name refers to:

Anne Charnock, science fiction author
Dr. Christina Comty-Nygren (née Charnock), (1928-2007) English nephrologist, accomplished researcher, and professor of medicine at McGill University, the University of Pittsburgh, and the University of Minnesota. 
Clement Charnock,  (1865–1950) mechanical engineer who worked in Russia
Harry Charnock, brother of Clement and pioneer of football in Russia
Henry Charnock, (1920–1997), English meteorologist
Job Charnock (c. 1630 – c. 1693), British trade agent in India; said to be the founder of Calcutta
Kieran Charnock (born 1984), English football player
Lewis Charnock, (born 1994), English rugby player
Mark Charnock (born 1968), English actor
Phil Charnock (born 1975), English football player
Robert Charnock (1663–1696), English conspirator in the plot to assassinate William III
Roger Charnock (1588–1645), English politician
Stephen Charnock (1628–1680), English Puritan Presbyterian clergyman
Thomas Charnock (1516–1581), English alchemist and occultist
Thomas Charnock (MP)  (1587–1648), English politician.

References

English toponymic surnames